is a series of action role-playing games developed by Monolith Soft and published by Nintendo. The series began with the original Xenoblade Chronicles  game, published for the Nintendo Wii in 2010. Though initially only released in Japan, it was localized into other regions as a result of Operation Rainfall, a large grass-roots fan campaign to pressure Nintendo to localize several Japan-exclusive games. The original game became a critical and commercial success, spawning multiple sequels. The series has since sold more than 8.2 million copies worldwide. Xenoblade Chronicles has been well-received for its world design, music, stories, and themes. The series has been represented in other gaming franchises, including the Super Smash Bros. and Project X Zone series. It is loosely a part of the Xeno metaseries, for which it receives its namesake, co-created and directed by Tetsuya Takahashi.

Gameplay 
The gameplay within the Xenoblade Chronicles series uses a real-time action-based battle system, where the player manually moves a character in real-time, and party members will "auto-attack" when enemies enter their attack radius. Manually input attacks, called "Arts", may also be performed, but in a limited fashion. Battle Arts are only available after a "cool down" period that occurs after every use, while character specific "Talent Arts" only become available after enough auto-attacks are executed.  Both party members and enemies have a finite number of health points, and attacks deplete this value. Combat is won when all enemies lose their HP, but the game is lost if the player's character loses all their HP and has no means of being revived. Health may be restored by the player by using healing Arts in battle, or the player may let characters' HP regenerate automatically outside of battle. Winning battles earns the player experience points, which allows the characters to grow stronger by leveling up and learning new Arts. Arts for each character must be set by the player on their respective set up, called a  "Battle Palette", outside of battles. Additionally, exploring large environments is a defining aspect of gameplay.

Plot

Story 
The stories and characters vary with each game in the Xenoblade Chronicles series, however series creator Tetsuya Takahashi believes that the series is defined by the players' desire to remain in the game world. The core concept of these games is to keep players immersed in these worlds, allowing them to freely explore.

In the series's fictional chronology, Xenoblade Chronicles is the second game to take place. Its epilogue, Xenoblade Chronicles: Future Connected is set one year after the events of the main game. Xenoblade Chronicles 2 takes place in a parallel universe, occurring simultaneously to the events of Xenoblade Chronicles. Its prequel, Xenoblade Chronicles 2: Torna – The Golden Country is set 500 years before the events of the game. Xenoblade Chronicles 3 takes place an unspecified amount of time after the previous games, and depicts the future of the worlds of Xenoblade Chronicles and Xenoblade Chronicles 2.

Setting
While the Xenoblade games do not share any setting directly, its universes are directly linked except for Xenoblade Chronicles X which is regarded as a spiritual successor. However, it is represented as a single episode in the overall universe. Two colossal titans known as the Bionis and the Mechonis serve as the setting for Xenoblade Chronicles; with the Future Connected epilogue taking place in a smaller area, the Bionis's shoulder. Xenoblade Chronicles X takes place on an alien planet known as Mira. Xenoblade Chronicles 2 and its prequel Torna – The Golden Country take place in the world of Alrest, which contains several titans that house many different nations. Xenoblade Chronicles 3 takes place in the world of Aionios, a large continent made up of areas from Xenoblade Chronicles and Xenoblade Chronicles 2.

Characters
Each game in the series introduces its own set of characters. There are a number of recurring character archetypes. Tracing back to Xenogears, the series has always included a character with the name beginning with "Van-". Vangarre appears in Xenoblade Chronicles, Jack Vandham in Xenoblade Chronicles X, Vandham in Xenoblade Chronicles 2 and Guernica Vandham in Xenoblade Chronicles 3. There have been numerous callbacks to KOS-MOS from Xenosaga. She appears as a rare Blade in Xenoblade Chronicles 2. Her general appearance has been reflected in several characters' designs, including Elma's true form in Xenoblade Chronicles X and Poppi QTπ in Xenoblade Chronicles 2. Additionally, Nia's awakening scene in Xenoblade Chronicles 3 bears a strong resemblance to KOS-MOS' introduction scene in Xenosaga Episode I.

A race of small furry creatures known as the Nopon have appeared in every title in the series. In contrast to their appearances, the Nopon race, in general, tend to be greedy and selfish by nature. In every game, the names of Nopon non-player characters have been carried over to the next installment as the main Nopon character: Satata (Tatsu in Japan) from Xenoblade Chronicles appears in Xenoblade Chronicles X. The Xenoblade Chronicles X incarnation of Tatsu has a major rival known as Tora, who also appears in Xenoblade Chronicles 2 as a playable Nopon character.

Development

2006–2015: Xenoblade Chronicles and X

The staff at Monolith Soft was left in a state of low morale after the commercial failure of the Xenosaga series which ultimately led to its premature end. In July 2006, Tetsuya Takahashi was struck by the idea of people living on top of enormous titans, so he wrote the concept down and turned it into a 3D model. The project was initially called Monado: Beginning of the World, but was changed to Xenoblade in Japan to honor Tetsuya Takahashi's previous work on the Xeno series and for his hard work on the game. Nintendo of Europe announced that they were publishing the game, adding Chronicles to Xenoblade. Due to no plans to release the title in North America, the fans launched a fan-campaign known as Operation Rainfall to convince Nintendo to bring Xenoblade Chronicles to North America along with The Last Story and Pandora's Tower. After months of silence, Nintendo of America confirmed that the title was headed for North America in April 2012.

Monolith Soft began development of Xenoblade Chronicles, an action role-playing game for the Nintendo Wii that was released in Japan on June 10, 2010. The game was later localized by Nintendo of Europe and was released in Europe and Australia on August 19, 2011, and September 1, 2011, respectively. It was then brought over to North America as a GameStop exclusive on April 6, 2012. Shulk and his friends embark on a quest to get revenge against the Mechon for the assault on their home. As they journey along the backs of the titans, they unravel the secrets of a powerful weapon known as the Monado. It was originally released on the Wii and later ported to the New Nintendo 3DS as Xenoblade Chronicles 3D, and remastered as Xenoblade Chronicles: Definitive Edition on the Nintendo Switch. Xenoblade Chronicles 3D, a port handled by Monster Games, was released worldwide in April 2015 for the New Nintendo 3DS.

An interstellar war forces humanity to flee a destroyed Earth. After crashing on the uncharted planet Mira, Elma and her team race against time to retrieve the Lifehold, a structure that contains thousands of lives. It was released on the Wii U.

2016–2018: Xenoblade Chronicles 2 

In a world of dying titans, Rex meets the living weapon Pyra and promises to bring her to the fabled paradise Elysium. It was released on the Nintendo Switch.

Xenoblade Chronicles 2: Torna – The Golden Country is set 500 years before the events of Xenoblade Chronicles 2, Lora and Jin fight against Malos and his army before the inevitable fall of their kingdom, Torna. It was released on the Nintendo Switch as both a standalone game and as an expansion for Xenoblade Chronicles 2.

2019–present: Xenoblade Chronicles 3 

Xenoblade Chronicles: Future Connected is set one year after the events of the main story in the original Xenoblade Chronicles. Taking place on the Bionis' Shoulder, an area not explored in the original game, Future Connected follows Melia, Shulk, and Riki's daughter Nene and adopted son Kino as they seek to reclaim the city of Alcamoth. It was released on the Nintendo Switch as part of the remaster Xenoblade Chronicles: Definitive Edition.

Xenoblade Chronicles 3 takes place in the world of Aionios, with two warring nations: Keves and Agnus. It features a narrative depicting the respective futures for the worlds of Xenoblade Chronicles and Xenoblade Chronicles 2. Main protagonists Noah from Keves and Mio from Agnus must put aside their differences in order to face the larger threat. It was released on the Nintendo Switch.

Xenoblade Chronicles 3'''s fourth and final wave of the downloadable content will include a major story expansion to be released by the end of 2023. Monolith Soft has teased that the volume could be as large as Xenoblade Chronicles 2: Torna – The Golden Country.

 Future 
In regards to the future of the franchise, series director and producer Genki Yokota ensured that the series will go on and that they would like to keep it going for as long as possible. Xenoblade Chronicles 3 is the conclusion to the story arc of Xenoblade Chronicles and Xenoblade Chronicles 2, however Tetsuya Takahashi indicated that it is not the end of the series. He suggested that those who play the game and the stories in the expansion pass can imagine what lies ahead for the series. Series director Koh Kojima expressed an interest in making Xenoblade Chronicles X2.

ReceptionXenoblade Chronicles sold nearly 200,000 units in Japan by the end of 2013. In a later interview, the game sold better in the west than it did in Japan. As of December 2015, Xenoblade Chronicles X sold roughly 377,000 units between Japan, France, and the United States. Xenoblade Chronicles 2 sold 1.42 million copies as of June 2018, which became the best-selling title ever developed by Monolith Soft. Its sales performance exceeded the company's expectations in western territories. Xenoblade Chronicles 2: Torna – The Golden Country was also noted for surpassing their sales expectations in Japan as well. As of December 2022, Xenoblade Chronicles 3 has sold 1.81 million units

 Legacy 

 In other media 
The Xenoblade Chronicles series has been represented in different mediums. Shulk appears as a playable fighter in Super Smash Bros. for Nintendo 3DS and Wii U and Super Smash Bros. Ultimate. Pyra and Mythra also appear as a dual character as downloadable content for Super Smash Bros. Ultimate. In addition to Shulk, Dunban from the original Xenoblade Chronicles as well as Rex and Nia from Xenoblade Chronicles 2 appear as Mii Fighter costumes in Ultimate. A Shulk amiibo figure was released in February 2015, which functions as an NPC opponent in Super Smash Bros. and unlocks costumes based on Shulk in Yoshi's Woolly World and Super Mario Maker. Fiora from the original Xenoblade Chronicles appears as a playable character in Project X Zone 2. The Legend of Zelda: Breath of the Wild features the outfit worn by Rex in Xenoblade Chronicles 2''. 

Good Smile Company has released several figures based on characters from the series, including Pyra, Mythra, KOS-MOS, Melia, and Nia.

Notes

References

 
Role-playing video games
Japanese role-playing video games
Nintendo franchises
Video game franchises
Video game franchises introduced in 2010